Head of a Catalan Peasant is an emblematic sequence of oil paintings and pencil made by Joan Miró between 1924 and 1925. Miró began this series the same year that André Breton published his Manifesto of Surrealism. The series was made partly in Paris. For Joan Miró "a peasant" symbolized rural knowledge, and also reflected his Catalan identity.

The Fundació Joan Miró of Barcelona keeps several preparatory drawings for this series.

The work demonstrates that Miró had ties with his homeland throughout his career. Joan Miró created this series in response to the prohibition of the Catalan language by Miguel Primo de Rivera. He was also influenced by the rural environment of Baix Camp. In this series he further develops the language started in works such as Catalan Landscape (The Hunter). The sequence followed by Miró has been interpreted several times as a progressive simplification of the same scene. Christopher Green, in turn, says that this is not exactly a linear trend toward simplification, but rather a dilemma, an internal discussion between the artist which creates the filled pictorial space.

Description 
The series shares the synthetic representation of the figure of a Catalan peasant, by a repetition of symbols such as the triangular head, the beard and red hat (called Barretina), all combined in one pole figure. In this group of oil paintings, Miró outlines the figure of a farmer several times, working with neutral background blue or yellow. As said Margit Rowell, Joan Miró explained his intentions with this work:

Series

Head of a Catalan Peasant (1924) 

This first version of the Catalan Peasant was painted in 1924 and is now part of the permanent collection of the National Gallery of Art in Washington, D.C. It became part of the collection as a gift of the Collectors Committee of the institution. The work is signed at lower right: Miró / 1924. The back of the work is signed Joan Miró, Tête de Paysan Catalan, 1924.

Exhibitions

Head of a Catalan Peasant 

Is the most unknown of the series, which belongs to a private collector, but has been seen in several exhibitions:

Exhibitions

Catalan peasant with guitar 

This work demonstrates the process of synthesis that Miró began using in his compositions later in his trip to France in the early 20s, after coming into contact with the Surrealists and Dadaists. Miró began to create his own sign language. In this version of the series, you can see the farmer's body with a hat on an intense blue background.

Head of a Catalan Peasant (10 March 1925) 

The version preserved in Edinburgh is the third of four Catalan Peasants that Miró made. You can understand this painting as a self-portrait of Miró, which affirms his Catalan identity. The work, conducted in 1925, was made at a time when Miró was gradually moving away from Cubism. Previously the work had been part of private collection of Roland Penrose. Currently the work is preserved in the Scottish National Gallery of Modern Art. It was acquired along with the help of the Art Fund, the Friends of the Tate Gallery and the Knapping Fund 1999.

Head of a Catalan Peasant  1925 

This version is kept in Moderna Museet, Stockholm. It joined the museum with the registration number MOM 445, in the legacy of Gerard Bonnier in 1989. He had previously been owned by Jacques Viot, Galerie Pierre (Loeb), Private Samling, Marcel Mabille and Svensk-Fransk Konstgalleriet. This version is one of the synthetic series, dominated by a blue a bit more intense than in the rest of the works. You can also see a black cross, surmounted by a small hat. The space is decorated with a pair of stars, one white and one black.

References

Further reading 
 
 
 Kramer, Hilton. "Modern Art at the National Gallery." The New Criterion 7, no. 8 (April 1989): 3. 1989

 Dupin, Jacques. Miró. New York, 1962: 162, 166. 1962

1925 paintings
Paintings by Joan Miró
Collections of the National Gallery of Art